Ovid Glasgow (born 14 April 1945) is a Guyanese cricketer. He played in four first-class and two List A matches for Guyana from 1966 to 1972.

See also
 List of Guyanese representative cricketers

References

External links
 

1945 births
Living people
Guyanese cricketers
Guyana cricketers